Richard Nathaniel Curzon, 2nd Viscount Scarsdale (3 July 1898 – 1977) was an English peer and landowner, a member of the House of Lords for more than fifty years.

Life
Curzon was the only son of Colonel Alfred Nathaniel Curzon, by his marriage to Henrietta Mary Montagu. He was also a nephew of George Curzon, 1st Marquess Curzon of Kedleston, head of the family.

The young Curzon was educated at Eton and the Royal Military College, Sandhurst, commissioned into the Royal Scots Greys, and saw active service in the final months of the First World War, in France and Belgium, then after the Armistice of November 1918 in Germany, Egypt, Syria, and Palestine. In 1923, he was appointed as Honorary Attaché to the British embassy in Rome.

His uncle's marriage had produced only three daughters, and he was widowed in 1906, leaving Curzon's father as the heir presumptive to the family estates based on Kedleston Hall in Derbyshire and the peerage of Baron Scarsdale. His uncle was also given other peerages, and in 1911 was created Viscount Scarsdale, with a special remainder to his father and his father's heirs male. In 1917, Marquess Curzon, by now in his late fifties, married secondly Grace Duggan, a rich young widow, hoping for a son and heir, but it was not to be. Curzon's father died in 1920, leaving him as the heir presumptive, and on the death of Marquess Curzon in 1925 Richard Nathaniel Curzon became head of the Curzon family. His inheritance included Kedleston Hall, the baronetcy created for his ancestor Sir John Curzon (1598–1686), and the new title of Viscount Scarsdale.

On 14 April 1923, Curzon married firstly Mildred Carson Dunbar, a daughter of William Roland Dunbar. They had four daughters and were divorced in 1946. On 10 August of that year he married secondly Ottilie Margarete Julie Pretzlik, daughter of Charles Pretzlik and Ottilie Hennig, but had no further children. His daughters were:
Anne Mildred Curzon (born 1923), who in 1942 married Major W. J. L. Willson, son of Sir Walter Willson, and had two sons and a daughter.
Gloria Mary Curzon (1927–1979), who in 1951 married J. G. Bearman and had two sons.
Juliana Eveline Curzon (1928–2006), who in 1948 married firstly G. D. S. Smith, and had two daughters and a son before they were divorced. She was later married to Frederick Nettleford (1953–1956), Sir Dudley Cunliffe-Owen (1956–1962) and John Roberts (1962–1972).
Diana Geraldine Curzon (1934–2013)

Scarsdale returned to the army in the Second World War, as a Captain in the Derbyshire Yeomanry, and was awarded the Territorial Decoration. He was also appointed Commander of the Most Venerable Order of the Hospital of St John of Jerusalem.

On his death in 1977, Lord Scarsdale was succeeded by a cousin, Francis Curzon.

Notes

1898 births
1977 deaths
Commanders of the Order of St John
Derbyshire Yeomanry officers
Graduates of the Royal Military College, Sandhurst
People educated at Eton College
Royal Scots Greys officers
Viscounts Scarsdale
Richard Nathaniel
British Army personnel of World War II
British Army personnel of World War I